An election to Dublin County Council took place on 20 June 1985 as part of that year's Irish local elections. Councillors were elected from local electoral areas by PR-STV voting for a six-year term of office.

The election took place in three electoral counties established by the Local Government (Reorganisation) Act 1985:
 Dublin–Belgard (26 councillors)
 Dublin–Fingal (24 councillors)
 Dún Laoghaire–Rathdown (28 councillors)

External links
 Official website
 irishelectionliterature

References

1985 Irish local elections
1985